Hazel Campbell (1940 – 12 December 2018) was a Jamaican writer, notably of short stories and children's books, who was also a teacher, editor and public relations worker.

Biography
Hazel Dorothy Campbell was born in Jamaica, where she attended Merl Grove High School in Kingston. She subsequently earned a BA degree in English & Spanish at the University of the West Indies, Mona, followed by Diplomas in Mass Communications and Management Studies. She worked as a teacher, as a public relations worker, editor, features writer and video producer for the Jamaican Information Service, the Ministry of Foreign Affairs and the Creative Production and Training Centre. From 1987 she freelanced as a communications consultant.

Her first published book, in 1978, was The Rag Doll & Other Stories, and she went on to become one of the most prolific writers produced by Jamaica. She was particularly noted for her children's books, and the Jamaica Gleaner noted: "Campbell had an in-depth understanding of children and demonstrated giftedness in crafting material that engaged their attention in literature." Her short stories appeared in publications including West Indian Stories (ed. John Wickham, 1981), Caribanthology I (ed. Bruce St. John, 1981), Focus 1983; Facing the Sea (ed. Anne Walmsley, 1986); and When de Mark Buss: Black British and Caribbean Short Stories (2001).

Reviewing her 1991 story collection Singerman, Keith Jardim wrote: "The excellence of Hazel D. Campbell’s short stories lies not only in the bright, robust prose of her third and latest collection, Singerman, but also in her portrayals of the preoccupations of the Caribbean people, race, class, and poverty - how they have cursed the region. ... all of these stories are beautifully written, wise, and sweeping in moral concerns."

Campbell died on 12 December 2018, aged 78, at the University Hospital of the West Indies in Kingston, following a brief illness. A collection of her short stories, Jamaica On My Mind, was posthumously published in 2019, and Suzanne Scafe noted in Small Axe: "Reading Campbell's earliest stories three and four decades later, one is astonished at the prescient ways sexuality, gender relations, and the nuanced forms of the women characters’ resistance are represented."

Selected bibliography
 The Rag Doll & Other Stories (Savacou, 1978) 
 Woman’s Tongue (Savacou, 1985) 
 Singerman (short stories; Peepal Tree, 1991)
 Tilly Bummie and Other Stories (1993)
 Jamaica On My Mind: New and Collected Stories, introduction by Jacqueline Bishop (Peepal Tree Press, 2019, 346pp.)

References

External links
 "Peepal Tree Eulogizes Recently Deceased Jamaican Writer Hazel Campbell", Wadadli Pen, 1 January 2019.

1940 births
2018 deaths
20th-century Jamaican women writers
20th-century Jamaican writers
20th-century short story writers
Jamaican children's writers
Jamaican short story writers
Jamaican women children's writers
Jamaican women short story writers
University of the West Indies alumni